Maryland Route 565 (MD 565) is a collection of state highways in the U.S. state of Maryland.  These highways are sections of old alignment of U.S. Route 213 (US 213), the predecessor route to US 50, between Trappe and Easton.  The two mainline sections of MD 565 run from Trappe to US 50 south of Easton and within the southern part of Easton.  MD 565 was assigned to the Trappe–Easton section in the early 1940s when US 213 was moved to a new alignment between Trappe and Peach Blossom Creek in southern Talbot County.  MD 565A was designated in the late 1950s in the southern part of Easton and extended north of the downtown area in the mid-1960s.  Portions of MD 565 were returned to municipal maintenance in Easton and Trappe in the mid-1980s and late 1990s.

Route description

There are two mainline sections of MD 565:
MD 565 (without suffix) runs  from Maple Avenue in Trappe north to US 50 south of Easton.

MD 565 begins as Main Street in the center of the town of Trappe. Main Street continues south  from Maple Avenue as a municipal street to a junction with US 50. The state highway heads north as a two-lane undivided road and its name changes to Easton Trappe Road on leaving the town after passing White Marsh Road.  A short distance north of Llandaff Road near the hamlet of Llandaff a short distance south of Peach Blossom Creek, MD 565 turns sharply to the east and reaches its northern terminus at US 50 (Ocean Gateway).

MD 565A, which is known as Washington Street, begins at an intersection with MD 322 (Easton Parkway) a short distance north of MD 322's southern intersection with US 50.  After crossing Paper Mill Pond, the two-lane undivided state highway reaches its northern terminus at Lee Terrace.  Washington Street, which was once part of a longer MD 565A, continues north as a municipal street into downtown Easton.

History
MD 565 was assigned to the old alignment of US 213 between Trappe and Peach Blossom Creek south of Easton by 1946 after US 213 was moved to a new alignment, presently used by US 50, in 1941.  MD 565A was assigned to Washington Street south of MD 33 in 1958.  MD 565A was extended north to Easton Parkway in 1965 when MD 33 was assigned to the northern part of Easton Parkway.  The MD 565A designation was removed from Washington Street north of downtown Easton in 1985.  The remainder of MD 565A north of Lee Terrace was transferred to the town of Easton in 1999. The portion of Main Street south of MD 565's present southern terminus was transferred to the town of Trappe in 1999.

Junction list

MD 565

MD 565A

Auxiliary route
MD 565B is the designation for an unnamed  service road that continues straight, to serve as a driveway for an auto dealership, from MD 565 just before that highway's northern terminus at US 50.

See also

References

External links

MD 565 @ MDRoads.com

565
Maryland Route 565